Juan Gómez or Gomez may refer to:

Chief Gómez (fl. 18401850), a Mescalero Apache chieftain
Juan Gómez González (1954–1992), Spanish football forward
Juan Gómez de Mora (1586–1648), Spanish architect who helped construct the town of Simancas
Juan Vicente Gómez (1857–1935), president of Venezuela on three occasions between 1908 and 1935
Juan Gómez (Argentine footballer) (born 1971), Argentine footballer
Juan Gómez (Mexican footballer) (1926–2009), Mexican footballer who played for CF Atlas and Mexico
Juan Gómez, bassplayer for the band Opal
Juan Gómez Medina (born 1992), Chilean footballer
Juan Gómez-Jurado (born 1977), Spanish journalist
Juan Gómez-Quiñones (born 1940), American historian, poet and activist
Juan Gualberto Gómez (1854–1933), Afro-Cuban revolutionary leader, writer and Cuban Representative and Senator
Juan Sebastián Gómez (born 1992), Colombian tennis player who was the top ranking male junior player for 2010
Juan Gómez, guide and boat pilot in southwest Florida in the late 1800s, supposedly connected to the mythical pirate José Gaspar
Juan Felipe Gomez (born 1977), Colombian racquetball player
Juan Augusto Gómez (born 1976), Argentina-born Mexican footballer
Juan Carlos Gómez (rower) (born 1932), Argentine rower
Juan Carlos Gómez (born 1973), Cuban boxer
Juan Gomez (rugby union) (born 1984), Argentine rugby union player
Juan José Gómez (born 1980), Salvadoran football goalkeeper
Juan Pablo Gómez (born 1991), Argentine-born Chilean footballer
Juan Gómez (boxer), Puerto Rican boxer, see Boxing at the 1993 Central American and Caribbean Games